Eduardo José Cabra Martínez (born September 10, 1979, in Santurce, San Juan, Puerto Rico), better known by his stage name "Visitante Calle 13", "Visitante", or more recently, "Cabra" is a Puerto Rican producer, musician, composer, and multi-instrumentalist. He rose to fame due to the Puerto Rican band Calle 13, which he co-founded with his step brother René Pérez Joglar ("Residente").

Calle 13 quickly became one of the most influential bands in Latin America and the world. Eduardo currently holds a record for 28 awards and 44 Latin Grammy nominations, being the big winner in the 2011 ceremony with 9 awards. He also has special recognitions such as the ASCAP Vanguard Award for his contribution to the development of new genres in Latin America. As part of Calle 13, Eduardo collaborated with high-calibre artists such as Shakira, Tom Morello, Silvio Rodríguez and Rubén Blades, among others.

As musical producer, Eduardo is characterized by giving a global stamp to the music he creates, bringing musical influences from all over the world without losing the essence of the artist he records. Eduardo has produced incredible international artists, including Silvina Moreno, Diana Fuentes, La Vida Bohème, Chambao, Gustavo Cordera and Jorge Drexler.

Early life
Visitante, was born on September 10, 1979, in Santurce, San Juan, Puerto Rico.  His father was also a musician.  Visitante met his step-brother Residente when they were both two years old, when Residente's mother married Visitante's father. The family developed strong ties to the Puerto Rican arts community; his stepmother, Flor Joglar de Gracia, was an actress in Teatro del Sesenta, a local acting troupe, while his father was still a musician at the time.  His stepbrother Residente asserts that he and his family lived a relatively comfortable lifestyle growing up, placing them in a group of Puerto Ricans who are "too poor to be rich and too rich to be poor".  Although their parents later divorced, the stepbrothers remained close. When he was at the seventh grade, he was once reprimanded and taken to the school principal's office for refusing to sing the American national anthem - he would later become a supporter of the Puerto Rican independence, just like Residente.
Residente attendeded the Savannah College of Art and Design in Savannah, Georgia, where he obtained a master's degree in art, while Visitante continued refining his skills as a musician, directing bands Kampo Viejo and Bayanga. When Residente returned to Puerto Rico the band Calle 13 was almost immediately put together.

In late 2010 Visitante married Cuban singer Diana Fuentes.

Musical career

Calle 13 
Visitante has been a musician most of his life, but it was not until 2004 that he began making music with his step-brother Residente, giving the band the name Calle 13 (band). The step-brothers hosted their music on a website, and began searching for a record label in order to release their music commercially.  After sending demo tapes to White Lion Records, the duo was offered a record deal.  The duo gained recognition for their controversial song "Querido FBI", which responded to the killing of Filiberto Ojeda Ríos, a key figure for the Puerto Rican independence movement.

Cabra chose his stage name "Visitante" because that is how he had to identify himself to the guard every time he returned to his brother's house in Trujillo Alto. Visitante's influences come from numerous musical genres. Artists that were influential on him included salsa master Rubén Blades, singer-songwriter Silvio Rodríguez and writer Tite Curet Alonso. As musical director of Calle 13 (band), he created several of the most popular rhythms of the 21st century and catapulted the group to levels never before seen in the genre.

Eduardo functioned as multi-instrumentalist, musical directos, arranger, and producer of every album the band released during their 10 years of career. All together, Visitante and his band Calle 13 have won 19 Latin Grammy Awards and 3 Grammys, the most by any group.

Debut Album 
In January 2006, their first album, Calle 13, is released and results in incredible success. The band wins its first three Latin Grammys, and becomes in the band with most wins that year. This album was made with the intention of giving it away for free and making it viral. The musical proposal is a search of different musical styles and genres that mirrored a trend within the urban genre at the time which was based on the search of new rhythms and beats.

Internationalization 
After the unexpected success of the initial album and after traveling around Latin America looking for inspiration, they released their second album Residente o Visitante in 2007. For this album Eduardo manages to infuse even more musicality and global fusions to the band's music, collaborating for the first time with international artists such as La Mala Rodríguez, Vicentico and  Bajofondo Tangoclub, among others. This was the band's first album to reach number 1 on the Billboard charts and for which they won their first Grammy Awards for Best Latin Urban Album.

Now an international band, Calle 13 enters a stage of musical expansion at more complex and broad levels. From this stage, the song Latin America stands out, as well as their collaborations with, Café Tacvba, Rubén Blades, Silvio Rodríguez and Tom Morello.

Entren Los Que Quieran is the album with the most Latin Grammy Awards in history, and Eduardo was nominated for the first time as best individual producer by the Grammys Awards.

After the band became known world-wide, and obtained multiple recognitions, Multi Viral was released, an ambitious album that took a year to record and whose production was made almost entirely in La Casa del Sombrero, Eduardo's production label. The record was produced by his own record label and was mixed by Michael Brower and Ritch Costey. For this album, Eduardo was nominated for the second time as the best producer of the year at the Latin Grammy Awards.

After this, in 2015, he decides to take a break to take on individual projects.

Cabra 
In 2020, Eduardo began his solo music career as CABRA, shining the spotlight on him as a vocalist for the first time. On July 17, 2020, Eduardo releases his first single "La Cabra Jala Pal Monte". This single was produced by himself and composed next to Rita Indiana. Its release came with an official video which was filmed in Buenos Aires and directed by Nicolás Sedano. "La Cabra Jala Pal Monte" was also the first release of his own label, La Casa del Sombrero. This song blends electronic sounds with a strong and fresh Latin percussion, creating a hip hop song mixed with his own avant-garde and risky style. In the lyrics, he presents himself as a singer and recounts the end of Visitor as the beginning of "Cabra".

His second single, "La Ventana", was released on September 9, 2020. This single was composed during COVID-19 quarantine, and Eduardo goes back to his Cumbia roots. He presents different places and experiences that he's been through in which there have also been darkness, as there was during the pandemic.

On March 2, 2021, he shared his third single, "Gris", through which CABRA gives an interesting twist to his musical concept, introducing us to a new side of introspective lyrics and sound within his repertoire. A song with an intense message and deep vibes. This video was directed by the visual collaborator of Trending Tropics, Niko Sedano and César Berrios, who do a great job in portraying the attitude of CABRA towards the responsibilities and blame that fall on him.

Finally, on May 31, 2021, Cabra debuted with his first self-titled EP, which includes "La Cabra Jala Pal Monte", "La Ventana" and "Gris", and comes with three additional songs, "Lingote", "Un Belén" and "Quisiera Ser Un Meme". Eduardo collaborates with his daughter Azul in the song "Quisiera Ser Un Meme", which criticizes the need for artists to go viral, drifting away from the artistic purpose of communicating and making art. "Lingote" is an outlet against those who take credit or "hang medals" they don't deserve. Finally, Cabra pays tribute with "Un Belen" to the "corrillo," those friends and family who left us in recent times. From the point of view of us, the ones who stayed.

As Musical Producer 
In 2013, Eduardo began his career as an independent musical producer with the production of Cuban singer Diana Fuentes's debut album. Since then, Eduardo has worked with many established artists, as well as helped smaller artists obtain industry recognition through his work and musical productions.

As a producer, Eduardo stands out for his ability to integrate rhythms and influences from around the world within the style of the artist he records, helping give the artist a unique personality, while giving transcendence to their music by filling it with unique nuances. Trending Tropics, a project Eduardo worked on with his partner Vicente Garca in which they explored diverse sound textures and experimented with new materials, is proof of this, as he tells us in an exclusive interview for Rolling Stone Colombia.

Recently, Eduardo was given the opportunity to produce a song written by Sie7e and performed by Pedro Capó for a Pepsi commercial campaign in 2021. Gibson is another brand that has lately placed its trust in Eduardo. Additionally, has worked with Rita Indiana, Abel Pintos, Diana Fuentes, Vicente García, La Vida Boheme, Monsieur Periné, Chambao, Gustavo Cordera and Jorge Drexler, among many others.

At 38 years old, Eduardo Cabra is the producer with most Latin Grammy nominations and awards, with a total of 45 nominations and 28 wins.

La Casa del Sombrero 
La Casa Del Sombrero is a boutique label based in San Juan, Puerto Rico. It serves as a creative incubator for artists whose work is based on cultural truths in the highest quality of self expression. With Cabra as the driving force behind the venture, the label focuses entirely on the artist and their creative process, enriching the A&R experience. Artists that have worked with LCDS include Diana Fuentes, Sebastian Otero, and Eduardo Cabra himself for his solo debut.

Trending Tropics 
In summer of 2017, Eduardo began collaborating with Vicente García on a project called Trending Tropics. On July 11, 2018, it was presented live during a rehearsal open to the public in La Respuesta (Santurce) as part of the preparations for his show at the SummerStage in NYC. Trending Tropics is truly avant-garde and innovation, a perfect balance between global root music and thrilling electronic music. With a very solid artistic concept that deals with the distorted relationship of human beings and the technology that surrounds them, it is a transversal and cultural project that goes far beyond music. Musicians who have already joined Eduardo and Vicente for Trending Tropics include Carlos Alomar (David Bowie's guitarist), Ziggy Marley, Pucho y Guille (members of Vetusta Morla), Ana Tijoux, Jorge Drexler, Li Saumet (Bomba Estéreo), iLe, Amayo (from Antibalas), Acentoh or Wiso G, among others.

Cabraton 
By the end of 2020, Eduardo created the virtual activity "Cabratón", whose main objective is to connect the producer with his followers and fostering a space for creative interaction. This was carried out through a co-creation between content produced by CABRA and the participation of someone external to the artist.

The dynamic is that CABRA creates a totally new track live on his YouTube profile and then airs it through his SoundCloud profile. With this, he invites people to download it and encourages them to add value to this production through acapellas (voices), instruments or any type of session added to the track.

Participants have a deadline to submit their clues. In the following days, CABRA makes a detailed review of each of the materials sent, evaluating the combination of ideas, aesthetics and genres in order to select several singles and produce an EP.

Discography

 With Calle 13
 2005: Calle 13
 2007: Residente o Visitante
 2008: Los de Atrás Vienen Conmigo
 2010: Entren Los Que Quieran
 2014: Multi Viral

Compositions 

 2006: «No hay igual» (by Nelly Furtado)
 2007: «Beautiful Liar» (by Beyoncé y Shakira)
 2010: «Gordita» (from the album Sale el sol by Shakira)
 2013: «Todo Cae» (from the album Bailar en la Cueva by Jorge Drexler)
 2019: «Mario Neta» (from the album Jueves by Cuarteto de Nos)
 2021: «Somos» (single in collaboration with Guaynaa)
 2021: «Tarantinero» (from the album 777: A Quemarropa by LosPetitFellas)

Productions 
 2013: Todo cae, Jorge Drexler
 2015: Caja de Música, Monsieur Periné
 2016: A la mar, Vicente García
 2016: Tecnoanimal, Gustavo Cordera
 2016: Nuevo Ciclo, Chambao
 2016: Somos, Swing Original Monks
 2017: Sofá, Silvina Moreno
 2018: Encanto Tropical, Monsieur Periné
 2018: Trending Tropics junto con Vicente García
 2019: Candela, Vicente García
 2019: Jueves, El Cuarteto de Nos
 2019: Para Remendar el Cielo, Diana Fuentes Ft. Seu Jorge
 2020: Mi Derriengue, Riccie Oriach
 2020: 2030, LOUTA
 2020: After School, Rita Indiana
 2020: Mandinga Times, Rita Indiana
 2020: Dulce y Salado, Pedro Capó Ft. Visitante
 2021: Amor En Mi Vida, Abel Pintos
 2021: Atravesao, Elsa y Elmar
 2021: Fiesta en lo del Dr. Hermes, El Cuarteto de Nos
 2021: El Arca de Mima, Mima

Casa del Sombrero 

 2014: Planeta Planetario, Diana Fuentes
 2020: La Cabra Jala P'al Monte, CABRA
 2020: Juyendo, Sebastián Otero
 2020: La Ventana, CABRA
 2020: Cabratón Vol.1
 2021: Gris, CABRA
 2021: CABRA (EP)

Filmography 
 2006 – My Block: Puerto Rico (documentary), as himself.
 2009 – Mercedes Sosa, Cantora un viaje íntimo (documentary), as himself.
 2009 – Calle 13: Sin Mapa (documentary), as himself.

Public appearances 

 2017 – Hablando La Música Se Entiende(TEDxBerkleeValencia).
 2020 – A Conversation with... Eduardo Cabra(BIME PRO).
 2020 – Un Shot con CABRA: La Muerte de Visitante(Corriente Perú).
 2020 – Fábrica de hits en la nueva normalidad(Resonancia Colombia).
 2021 – Ecosistemas Musicales del FUTURO(FUTURX Argentina).
 2021 – Eduardo Cabra by Javier Andrade(Latin Alternative Music Conference).
 2021 – Amazessions: CABRA(Amazon Music).
 2021 – Final Panel: Jury Of Honor(Red Bull Battle US).
 2021 – Person Of The Year: Rubén Blades(22nd Latin Grammy Awards Ceremony).

Awards and nominations

Grammy Awards

|-
|  || Residente o Visitante || Best Latin Urban Album || 
|-
|  || Los de Atras Vienen Conmigo || Best Latin Urban Album || 
|-

|-
|  || Multi Viral || Best Latin Rock, Urban or Alternative Album  ||

Latin Grammy Awards

|-
|rowspan="3"| 2006 || Calle 13 || Best New Artist || 
|-
| Calle 13 || Best Urban Music Album || 
|-
|  "Atrévete-te-te" || Best Short Form Music Video || 
|-
|rowspan="4"| 2007 || Residente o Visitante|| Album of the Year || 
|-
| Residente o Visitante|| Best Urban Music Album || 
|-
|  "Pa'l Norte" (feat Orishas) || Best Urban Song || 
|-
| "Tango del Pecado" || Best Short Form Music Video || 
|-
|rowspan="5"| 2009 || Los de Atrás Vienen Conmigo|| Album of the Year || 
|-
| Los de Atrás Vienen Conmigo  || Best Urban Music Album || 
|-
| "No Hay Nadie Como Tu" (featuring Café Tacuba) || Record of the Year || 
|-
| "No Hay Nadie Como Tu"  (featuring Café Tacuba) || Best Alternative Song || 
|-
| "La Perla" (featuring Rubén Blades) || Best Short Form Music Video || 
|-
|rowspan="11"| 2011 || Entren Los Que Quieran|| Album of the Year || 
|-
| Entren Los Que Quieran  || Best Urban Music Album || 
|-
| "Latinoamérica" (featuring Totó la Momposina, Susana Baca and Maria Rita) || Record of the Year || 
|-
| "Latinoamérica" || Song of the Year || 
|-
|  rowspan="2" |Shakira's "Sale el Sol" (Composer)
| Album of the Year
|
|-
| Best Pop Vocal Album
|
|-
| "Calma Pueblo" || Best Alternative Song || 
|-
| "Baile de los Pobres"  (featuring Rafa Arcaute) || Best Urban Song || 
|-
| "Vamo' a Portarnos Mal" || Best Tropical Song || 
|-
| Rafael Arcaute and Calle 13 || Producer of the Year || 
|-
| "Calma Pueblo" || Best Short Form Music Video || 
|-
| rowspan="8"| 2014 || Multi Viral  || Best Urban Music Album || 
|-
| "Respira el Momento" || Record of the Year || 
|-
| "Ojos Color Sol" (feat Silvio Rodríguez) || Song of the Year || 
|-
| "El Aguante" || Best Alternative Song || 
|-
| "Adentro"  || Best Urban Song || 
|-
| "Cuando los Pies Besan el Piso"  || Best Urban Contemporary Album || 
|-
| "Adentro" || Best Urban Performance || 
|-
| "Adentro" || Best Short Form Music Video || 
|-
|rowspan="2"| 2015 || "Ojos Color Sol" (feat Silvio Rodríguez) || Best Short Form Music Video || 
|-
| "Así de Grandes Son las Ideas" || Best Short Form Music Video || 
|-
| 2017 || Visitante || Producer of the Year || 
|-
|rowspan="1"| 2021 || "CABRA (EP)" || Best Alternative Music Album || 
|-

Billboard Latin Music Awards

|-
|2007||Calle 13 || Best Reggaeton Album || 
|-
|2009||"No Hay Nadie Como Tu" || Hot Latin Song of the Year Vocal Duet or Collaboration || 
|-

Lo Nuestro Awards

|-
|2008||"Pa'l Norte" || Video of the Year || 
|-
|2009||"Un Beso de Desayuno" || Video of the Year || 
|-
|2010||"No Hay Nadie Como Tu" || Collaboration of the Year || 
|-

Los Premios MTV Latinoamérica

|-
| 2006|| Calle 13 || Promising Artist || 
|-
| 2007 || Calle 13  || Best Urban Artist || 
|-
| 2009 || Calle 13 || Best Urban Artist ||

Instituto Cubano de la Música

|-
|2010 || Calle 13 || Premio Internacional Cubadisco ||

Ateneo Puertorriqueño

|-
|2011 || Calle 13 || Medalla Ramón Emeterio Betances ||

Premios El País - Babelia 

|-
|2021 || CABRA || Músicas del Mundo - Latinoamérica y El Caribe ||

References

External links

 Calle 13 official website

1979 births
Puerto Rican reggaeton musicians
Living people
People from Santurce, Puerto Rico
Puerto Rican hip hop musicians
Puerto Rican guitarists
Puerto Rican multi-instrumentalists
Puerto Rican pianists
Puerto Rican percussionists
Melodica players
American harmonica players
American male organists
American accordionists
American banjoists
American mandolinists
American lutenists
American oud players
American ukulele players
Bombo legüero players
American acoustic guitarists
American male guitarists
Steel guitarists
Bouzouki players
American harpists
American autoharp players
Zither players
Conga players
American trombonists
Male trombonists
American male saxophonists
American trumpeters
American male trumpeters
American male violinists
American clarinetists
Theremin players
American cellists
Calle 13 (band) members
Puerto Rican independence activists
Latin Grammy Award winners
Triangle players
Latin music record producers
Latin music songwriters
Latin Grammy Award for Producer of the Year
20th-century American drummers
American male drummers
21st-century American saxophonists
21st-century accordionists
American male bass guitarists
Male pianists
21st-century American drummers
21st-century American bass guitarists
21st-century American keyboardists
21st-century clarinetists
21st-century trombonists
21st-century organists
21st-century American violinists
American organists